In mathematics, a Loewy ring or semi-Artinian ring is a ring in which every non-zero module has a non-zero socle, or equivalently if the Loewy length of every module is defined. The concepts are named after Alfred Loewy.

Loewy length

If M is a module, then define the Loewy series Mα for ordinals α by M0 = 0, Mα+1/Mα = socle(M/Mα), and Mα = ∪λ<α Mλ if α is a limit ordinal. The Loewy length of M is defined to be the smallest α with M = Mα, if it exists.

Semiartinian modules

Note that if  is an artinian module then  is a semiartinian module. Clearly 0 is semiartinian.

If  is a family of -modules, then  is semiartinian if and only if  is semiartinian for all

Semiartinian rings

 is called left semiartinian if  is semiartinian, that is,  is left semiartinian if for any left ideal ,  contains a simple submodule.

Note that  left semiartinian does not imply that  is left artinian.

References

Ring theory